La Convención Province is the largest of thirteen provinces in the Cusco Region in the southern highlands of Peru.

As part of the higher-altitude Amazon basin at the foot of the Andes, La Convención is one of three Peruvian provinces that prominently figure in national coffee production, the other being Chanchamayo province in Junín state and Jaén province in Cajamarca state.

Geography 
The La Convención Province is bounded to the north by the Junín Region and the Ucayali Region, to the east by the Madre de Dios Region, to the south by the Anta Province, the Calca Province and the Urubamba Province, and to the west by the Ayacucho Region and the Apurímac Region.

Between the glaciers and tundra of Salcantay and other high mountains to the rain forests of the Amazon Basin the topography is extremely rugged and varied.

The Urupampa and Willkapampa mountain ranges traverse the province. Some of the highest peaks of the province  are listed below:

Political divisions
The province is divided into fourteen districts, each of which is headed by a mayor (alcalde). The districts are:

Note: The Peruvian government estimates an underenumeration nationwide in the 2017 census of about 6 percent.

Ethnic groups 
The province is inhabited by indigenous citizens: Asháninka, Machiguenga, Yine and Quechua. Spanish is the language which the majority of the population (51.98%) learnt to speak in childhood, 39.82% of the residents started speaking using the Quechua language (2007 Peru Census).

See also 
 Administrative divisions of Peru

Sources 

Provinces of the Cusco Region